Dani Stevens (née Samuels, born 26 May 1988) is a retired Australian discus thrower who in 2009 became the youngest ever female world champion in the event. She is the current national and Oceanian record holder. Stevens qualified for the 2020 Tokyo Olympics and threw 58.77m in the Women's dicus throw. This was not a sufficient distance to qualify her for the final.

After winning the discus gold and shot put bronze medals at the 2005 World Youth Championships in Athletics, she went on to win the bronze medal in the discus at the 2006 Commonwealth Games in Melbourne at the age of seventeen. She won the discus silver at the 2007 Summer Universiade and represented Australia at her first World Championships in Athletics soon after. She reached the final of the 2008 Beijing Olympics and improved significantly the following year to win the gold medal at the 2009 World Championships in Athletics.

Samuels is one of only ten athletes (along with Valerie Adams, Usain Bolt, Veronica Campbell-Brown, Jacques Freitag, Yelena Isinbayeva, Kirani James, Jana Pittman, David Storl and Faith Kipyegon) to win world championships at the youth, junior, and senior level of an athletic event. Her personal best throws are 69.64 m for the discus and 17.05 metres in the shot put.

Samuels has also spent many winters playing basketball in the Waratah League alongside her sister, Jamie, who has played in the Women's National Basketball League.

Career
Samuels was born in 1988 to mother Tracy Samuels and father Mark Samuels. She is the second eldest of 4 children and the family grew up in Merrylands, a suburb of Sydney and started athletics at Greystanes Little Athletics club.

Samuels first attended Merrylands Public School, then moved onto Westfields Sports High School as a basketballer before changing to train with her coach Denis Knowles in the Westfields athletic program.

Her first global appearance came in the shot put at the 2003 World Youth Championships at the age of fifteen, at which she finished 13th in the qualifying rounds. She returned to the competition two years later (2005), winning the bronze medal in the shot put (with a new personal best throw of 15.53 m), and the gold medal in the discus. Samuels also took part in the 2005 Australian Youth Olympic Festival, winning the shot put and taking second place in the discus throw.

The following year (2006) Dani opened her season with an appearance at the 2006 Commonwealth Games – her first major senior championship. She reached the shot put final, finishing twelfth overall, but again it was in the discus where she excelled, winning the bronze medal at the age of seventeen. She threw a discus personal best of 60.63 m to win the 2006 World Junior Championships and was seventh overall in the shot put. Following this, she opted to focus solely on the discus throw at major tournaments. She closed the year with a sixth-place performance at the 2006 IAAF World Cup, representing Oceania.

Samuels became the joint Australian champion in the shot put with 'Ana Po'uhila at the start of 2007 and also won her first national title in the discus. She threw a near personal best of 60.47 m to take the silver medal behind Yarelis Barrios at the 2007 Summer Universiade. A few weeks later Dani took part in her first ever World Championships in Athletics, just missing out on qualifying for the final round of the women's discus competition as the best performing non-qualifier.

In 2008, she won her second discus national title and improved her best to 62.95 m in Brisbane. She reached the Olympic final in the discus at the 2008 Beijing Games, throwing 60.15 m for ninth place. Competing at the 2009 Summer Universiade, she became the Universiade champion, beating Żaneta Glanc to the gold medal by a margin of nearly two metres.

She achieved a then personal best throw throwing 65.44 metres to win the 2009 World Championships in Berlin. Samuels took part in the final edition of the IAAF World Athletics Final, but she was past her season's peak form taking fifth place with a sub-60 metre throw. She started strongly the following year, opening her season with a personal best of 65.84 m to win at the Sydney Track Classic in February. She gave a consistent series of throws at the 2010 Australian Championships winning a sixth consecutive national title with a best throw of 63.31 m.

Later in 2010 Samuels withdrew from the Australian team for the 2010 Commonwealth Games citing concerns over “health and security in Delhi”.

Dani came 10th at the 2011 World Athletics Championships, 12th at the 2012 Summer Olympics., and 10th again at the 2013 Worlds.

She won the gold at the 2014 Commonwealth Games with a throw of 64.88 m. At the 2016 Summer Olympics, she finished 4th, 44 cm behind Denia Caballero in bronze. The following year she threw a new personal best to claim silver at the London World Championships.

On 24 October 2021, Stevens announced her retirement from competing in Athletics.

Personal bests

All information taken from IAAF profile.

Achievements

References

External links

1988 births
Athletes (track and field) at the 2006 Commonwealth Games
Athletes (track and field) at the 2008 Summer Olympics
Athletes (track and field) at the 2012 Summer Olympics
Athletes (track and field) at the 2014 Commonwealth Games
Athletes (track and field) at the 2016 Summer Olympics
Athletes (track and field) at the 2018 Commonwealth Games
Australian female discus throwers
Commonwealth Games bronze medallists for Australia
Commonwealth Games gold medallists for Australia
Commonwealth Games medallists in athletics
Living people
Olympic athletes of Australia
Athletes from Sydney
Sportswomen from New South Wales
Universiade medalists in athletics (track and field)
World Athletics Championships athletes for Australia
World Athletics Championships medalists
Universiade gold medalists for Australia
Universiade silver medalists for Australia
Commonwealth Games gold medallists in athletics
World Athletics Championships winners
Medalists at the 2007 Summer Universiade
Medalists at the 2009 Summer Universiade
Athletes (track and field) at the 2020 Summer Olympics
Australian female shot putters
Medallists at the 2006 Commonwealth Games
Medallists at the 2014 Commonwealth Games
Medallists at the 2018 Commonwealth Games